Stephen Marvin Young (May 4, 1889December 1, 1984) was an American politician from the U.S. state of Ohio. A member 
of the Democratic Party, he served as a United States Senator from Ohio from 1959 until 1971.

Life and career
Young was born on May 4, 1889, in Norwalk, Ohio, the fourth and youngest child of Stephen Marvin Young and Isabella Margaret Wagner. He and his father (who was a judge in Huron County) were namesakes of his great-grandfather, Stephen Marvin (1797–1868), the first pioneer of Shelby, Ohio. He attended Kenyon College and Adelbert College.

Young received a law degree from Case Western Reserve University School of Law in Cleveland, Ohio, in 1911.

Young served in the Ohio House of Representatives from 1913 to 1917, and as an assistant prosecutor of Cuyahoga County, Ohio, from 1917 to 1918. During the World War I era, he served in the U.S. Army in field artillery. In 1919, he returned to the Cuyahoga County prosecutor's office.

In 1922, Young ran for the office of Attorney General of Ohio. He won the Democratic nomination, but lost in the general election to Charles Crabbe, garnering 744,693 votes to Crabbe's 780,192. In 1930, he ran for the Democratic nomination for governor of Ohio but lost in the Democratic primary to former Representative George White, who went on to win the governorship.

From 1931 to 1932, Young served on the Ohio Commission on Unemployment Insurance. In 1932, Young was elected to one of Ohio's two at-large seats in the U.S. House of Representatives. He was re-elected to his seat in 1934. In 1936, instead of running for re-election to the House, Young ran for governor of Ohio again. This time, he lost the Democratic primary to incumbent Governor Martin Davey, who succeeded George White (against whom Young had run in 1930). From 1937 to 1939, Young served as special counsel to the attorney general of Ohio.

In 1938, Young again sought election to an at-large seat in the U.S. House of Representatives, but he and fellow Democrat John McSweeney were defeated by two Republicans, George H. Bender and L. L. Marshall. In 1940, Young was again elected to one of the at-large House seats; Bender retained the other. Losing that race were Marshall and Democrat Francis W. Durbin. In 1942, Ohio was reduced to one at-large House seat, and Young failed in his re-election bid, losing to Bender.

Young served in the U.S. Army from 1943 to 1946, entering as a major and being discharged as a lieutenant colonel. In 1945, during World War II, he served as the Allied Military Governor of the Province of Reggio Emilia in Italy. He returned to practicing law in Cleveland and Washington, D.C.

In 1948, Young was elected to the U.S. House for a fourth time, defeating his old adversary George H. Bender, but promptly lost his seat again to Bender in 1950. In 1956, Young ran for attorney general of Ohio, winning the Democratic nomination again but losing in the general election to Ohio House Speaker William Saxbe (who would later serve in the U.S. Senate, as well as U.S. Attorney General under Richard Nixon). In 1958, Young ran for the U.S. Senate against the Republican incumbent Senator John W. Bricker (who had been Thomas E. Dewey's running mate in the 1944 U.S. presidential election). Bricker seemed invincible, but Young capitalized on widespread public opposition to the proposed "right to work" amendment to Ohio's constitution, which Bricker had endorsed. Few thought that Young, who was 69 at the time, could win; even members of his own party had doubts, particularly Ohio's other senator, Democrat Frank J. Lausche. In an upset, Young defeated Bricker. Young knew that Lausche had not supported him and, when he took the oath of office, refused to allow Lausche to stand with him. This broke with the Senate custom of a senior senator escorting the junior senator of his state to take the oath.

Young was very narrowly re-elected in 1964, defeating the Republican nominee, then-Representative Robert Taft Jr., who was the son of conservative icon Senator Robert A. Taft from Ohio and the grandson of William Howard Taft. He decided not to run for re-election to the Senate in 1970. In the 1970 U.S. Senate primary, Howard Metzenbaum was selected to replace Young, but Metzenbaum lost the general election to Taft, who was again the Republican nominee. In 1976, Metzenbaum won Young's Senate seat back from Taft and held it for the Democratic Party until his retirement in 1995.

Young stood as a favorite son in the 1968 Ohio presidential primary. He did not enter any other primaries or stand as a candidate in his own right; he ultimately endorsed Hubert Humphrey.

In the Senate, Young was well known for his biting responses to abusive, offensive, or ignorant letters from constituents. On one occasion, he wrote, "Dear Sir: It appears to me that you have been grossly misinformed, or are exceedingly stupid. Which is it?" On another, he received a hostile letter that ended with the constituent's phone number and the message, "I would welcome the opportunity to have intercourse with you." Young wrote back, "you sir, can have intercourse with yourself."

Young lived in Washington, D.C., until his death on December 1, 1984. He was buried in Norwalk Cemetery, Norwalk, Ohio.

References

External links

Stephen Young, Former Senator From Ohio, Dies
Official Congressional Directory: 91st Congress, Second Session (1970) 

1889 births
1984 deaths
Candidates in the 1968 United States presidential election
Democratic Party United States senators from Ohio
Democratic Party members of the Ohio House of Representatives
United States Army personnel of World War II
United States Army personnel of World War I
Politicians from Cleveland
American prosecutors
Case Western Reserve University School of Law alumni
County district attorneys in Ohio
20th-century American politicians
Lawyers from Cleveland
United States Army officers
20th-century American lawyers
Kenyon College alumni
Democratic Party members of the United States House of Representatives from Ohio